Diplodia laelio-cattleyae is a fungal plant pathogen.

See also
 List of cattleya diseases

References

External links
 USDA ARS Fungal Database

Fungal plant pathogens and diseases
Orchid diseases
Botryosphaeriaceae
Fungi described in 1927